Tillamook Airport  is a public use airport located  south of the central business district of Tillamook, a city in Tillamook County, Oregon, United States. It is owned by the Port of Tillamook Bay. According to the FAA's National Plan of Integrated Airport Systems for 2009–2013, it is categorized as a general aviation facility.

The airfield was developed from the former Naval Air Station Tillamook and serves as the home to the Tillamook Air Museum.

Although many U.S. airports use the same three-letter location identifier for the FAA and IATA, this facility is assigned TMK by the FAA and OTK by the IATA (which assigned TMK to Tam-Ky, Vietnam).

Facilities and aircraft 
It has two asphalt paved runways: 13/31 is 5,001 by 100 feet (1,524 x 30 m) and 1/19 is 2,910 by 75 feet (887 x 23 m).

For the 12-month period ending April 2, 2008, the airport had 25,600 aircraft operations, an average of 70 per day: 99.6% general aviation and 0.4% military. At that time there were 45 aircraft based at this airport: 78% single-engine, 16% multi-engine, 2% jet, 2% helicopter and 2% ultralight.

References

External links 
Manana Port of Tillamook Bay Airport
 Aerial image as of 18 July 1994 from USGS The National Map
 

Tillamook, Oregon
Airports in Tillamook County, Oregon
World War II airfields in the United States
1942 establishments in Oregon